Brick Lane is a 2006 British documentary directed and produced by Minoo Bhatia. The documentary is about the personal stories and journeys of people who have made the street Brick Lane their home, how these different groups have shaped the town and the changing cultural markers that define the area. It was broadcast by BBC Two on 25 March 2006.

Overview
Brick Lane has changed with successive waves of immigration as newer communities reclaim the area as their own and older ones move out. The documentary explores the history of many first-generation immigrants over the centuries, it works its way back and forth in time through three groups of immigrants, from French Huguenots to Jewish immigrants and more recently Bangladeshi residents. For the Huguenots' story there were engravings and re-enactments by actors, and the Jewish and Bangladeshi experiences were explained by interviews.

First were 15,000 Huguenots Protestants who fled Catholic France in the 16th and 17th centuries to settle in Spitalfields. They brought with them skill as weavers – which they could practise in the East End outside the fortress of closed shops run by City of London guilds.

Next were the Jewish settlers who came from eastern Europe in the late 19th century and settled into the rag trade. The playwright Bernard Kops' late parents, Joel and Jenny, came to Brick Lane at the turn of the 20th century from Amsterdam. They were two of tens of thousands of Jewish immigrants who climbed financial survival.

In the 1950s, came the Bangladeshis, majority of them from the poor farming region of Sylhet. Shafiq arrived from Bangladesh in 1958, by the mid-1960s he was the first Asian manager of the Wimpy Bar chain and married a white woman Pamela. His contemporary Abdul Gaffer brought over his Bangladeshi wife, and despite not knowing English, he settled down to work and 50 years later is still there.

In addition, a Huguenot church turned into a Methodist chapel, then into a synagogue, and in 1976 became the Great London Mosque (Brick Lane Mosque). The Huguenots faced riots from jealous native textile workers. Kops witnessed the Battle of Cable Street, in which Oswald Mosley's fascists were finally taken on by his people. The Bangladeshis in the 1970s endured the attentions of the BNP and National Front, and responded with a sit-in that saw them off.

The story was of tolerance, overcoming prejudice in the hope of a brighter future in England and while Brick Lane has been enriching for some, others have only found extreme poverty.

Broadcast
Brick Lane was originally screened at Rich Mix as part of the East End Film Festival on 1 May 2006. It was later broadcast by BBC Two as part of A Night on Brick Lane and was followed by the drama film Banglatown Banquet on 25 March 2006 (the day before Bangladesh Independence Day).

See also

Brick Lane
Brick Lane Mosque
British Bangladeshi
British Jews
French migration to the United Kingdom
History of the Jews in the United Kingdom
History of Bangladeshis in the United Kingdom
Historical immigration to Great Britain

References

2006 television films
2006 films
2006 documentary films
British Bangladeshi films
Documentary films about London
Jewish British history
BBC television documentaries about history during the 16th and 17th centuries
BBC television documentaries about history during the 18th and 19th centuries
BBC television documentaries about history during the 20th Century
2000s English-language films
2000s British films